The 24th Dallas–Fort Worth Film Critics Association Awards honoring the best in film for 2018 were announced on December 17, 2018. These awards "recognizing extraordinary accomplishment in film" are presented annually by the Dallas–Fort Worth Film Critics Association (DFWFCA), based in the Dallas–Fort Worth metroplex region of Texas. The organization, founded in 1990, includes 30 film critics for print, radio, television, and internet publications based in north Texas. The Dallas–Fort Worth Film Critics Association began presenting its annual awards list in 1993.

Roma was the DFWFCA's most awarded film of 2018, taking three honors: Best Director (Alfonso Cuaron), Best Foreign Language Film and Best Cinematography (Cuaron).

Winners and runners-up

Category awards

Individual Awards

Russell Smith Award
 The Rider for "best low-budget or cutting-edge independent film"

References

2018
2018 film awards